Brierly Brook (Scottish Gaelic: Allt a' Bhrierlidh) is a community in the Canadian province of Nova Scotia, located  in Antigonish County. It is named after John Brierly (Briley, Brearly), an early settler, and former soldier who arrived in the area with Lt. Colonel Timothy Hierlihy.

References

Communities in Antigonish County, Nova Scotia